Mauricie–Bois-Francs was a former administrative region of Quebec.  It ceased to exist on July 30, 1997 (or August 20, 1997, upon publication in the Gazette officielle du Québec) when it was split into the modern-day administrative regions of Mauricie and Centre-du-Québec.

It consisted of the following regional county municipalities:
 Francheville
 Le Centre-de-la-Mauricie
 Le Haut-Saint-Maurice
 Maskinongé
 Mékinac

which became part of Mauricie, and:

 Arthabaska
 Bécancour
 Drummond
 L'Érable
 Nicolet-Yamaska

which became part of Centre-du-Québec.

References 

Former administrative regions of Quebec